Hammersbach is a municipality in the district of Main-Kinzig-Kreis, in Hesse, Germany.

Location
Hammersbach is located near Frankfurt am Main. Since 2007 Hammersbach has an official connection to the motorway A45 that has been planned for a long time. Prior to that, it was necessary to use the Raststätte Langen-Bergheim to get access the motorway.

Constituent communities

It consists of two villages: Marköbel and Langen-Bergheim. Only Marköbel once belonged to the Roman Empire. Parts of the Limes were found there recently.

Culture and sightseeing
Hammersbach has many beautiful old houses in the town center. The elementary school (Astrid-Lindgren-Schule) of Hammersbach can be seen easily from the fields around the village, because of the cone-shaped roof.

References

External links
 Official Website (in German)
 

Municipalities in Hesse
Main-Kinzig-Kreis